Ampliotrema cocosense is a species of lichen in the family Graphidaceae. Found in Cocos Island, Costa Rica, it was described as new to science in 2011.

References

Lichen species
Lichens described in 2011
Lichens of Central America
Taxa named by Robert Lücking
Ostropales